is a railway station operated by East Japan Railway Company (JR East) in Tsurumi-ku, Yokohama, Kanagawa Prefecture, Japan.

Lines

Station layout
Shin-Shibaura Station has two opposed side platforms serving two tracks, connected by a level crossing.

Platforms

History
Shin-Shibaura Station was opened on June 10, 1932 as a station on a spur line of the privately held . The line was extended on the Umi-Shibaura Station on November 1, 1940. The Tsurumi Rinkō line was nationalized on July 1, 1943, and was later absorbed into the Japan National Railway (JNR) network. The station has been unstaffed since March 1, 1971. Upon the privatization of the Japan National Railways (JNR) on April 1, 1987 the station has been operated by JR East.

Gallery

References
 Harris, Ken and Clarke, Jackie. Jane's World Railways 2008-2009. Jane's Information Group (2008).

External links
 JR East Shin-Shibaura Station